Esteban Andrés Carvajal Tapia (born 17 November 1988) is a Chilean footballer that currently plays for A.C. Barnechea as a defensive midfielder.

International career
Carvajal got his first call up to the senior Chile squad for the 2018 FIFA World Cup qualifiers against Brazil and Peru in October 2015.

Honours

Club
Unión San Felipe
 Primera B: 2009
 Copa Chile: 2009

References

External links

1988 births
Living people
Chilean footballers
Chile international footballers
Chilean expatriate footballers
Unión San Felipe footballers
S.C. Olhanense players
O'Higgins F.C. footballers
Santiago Wanderers footballers
Club Deportivo Palestino footballers
Deportes Iquique footballers
Coquimbo Unido footballers
Atlas F.C. footballers
Chilean Primera División players
Primera B de Chile players
Primeira Liga players
Expatriate footballers in Portugal
Expatriate footballers in Mexico
Chilean expatriate sportspeople in Portugal
Association football midfielders